The massasauga (Sistrurus catenatus) is a rattlesnake species found in midwestern North America from southern Ontario to northern Mexico and parts of the United States in between. Like all rattlesnakes, it is a pit viper and is venomous.

Three subspecies were recognized for more than a century, although research published in 2011 elevated two subspecies Sistrurus catenatus catenatus and Sistrurus catenatus tergeminus, to full species: the eastern massasauga (Sistrurus catenatus) and the western massasauga (Sistrurus tergeminus). The status of the third subspecies was somewhat unresolved and it is tentatively recognized as the desert massasauga (Sistrurus tergeminus edwardsii) by some, or synonymized with the western massasauga (Sistrurus tergeminus) by others.

Description

Their color pattern consists of a grey or tan ground color with a row of large, rounded, brown/black blotches or spots down the center of the back and three smaller rows of alternating spots down each side. Solid black melanistic examples are also known, as well as cases where the back blotches join with those on the sides. Young massasaugas are well-patterned, but paler than the adults. They have heat-sensing pits on each side of their smallish heads, their scales are keeled, and their anal scales are single.

Common names
Common names of the massasauga include: massasauga rattlesnake, massasauga rattler (Ontario), black massasauga, black rattler, black snapper, gray rattlesnake (Iowa), little grey rattlesnake (Canada), muck rattler, prairie rattlesnake, spotted rattler, swamp rattler, víbora de cascabel (Mexico), dwarf prairie rattlesnake, eastern massasauga great adder, ground rattlesnake, Kirtland's rattlesnake, little black rattlesnake, Michigan point rattler (Michigan), prairie massasauga, rattlesnake, small prairie rattlesnake, snapper, swamp massasauga, swamp rattlesnake, and triple-spotted rattlesnake.

The Native American word, "massasauga", means "great river-mouth" in the Ojibwe language and was probably given to describe grasslands surrounding the river deltas in Ojibwe country.

Geographic range
S. catenatus is found in North America from Ontario, Canada and western New York southwest to southeastern Arizona in the United States and northern Tamaulipas, Mexico. In Mexico, isolated populations exist in southern Nuevo León, north-central Coahuila, and Samalayuca, Chihuahua. It occurs in various habitats ranging from swamps and marshes to grasslands, usually below 1500 m elevation. The type locality given is "... on the prairies of the upper Missouri" (Valley, USA).

According to Campbell and Lamar (2004), a population also exists in southeastern Colorado that is morphologically somewhat intermediate between S. c. tergeminus and S. c. edwardsii.

Conservation status
The species S. catenatus is classified as least concern on the IUCN Red List of Threatened Species. The population trend is unknown. The eastern massasauga has been listed as a candidate species on the United States Endangered Species Act since 1999.

The eastern massasauga is listed as an endangered species in Illinois, Indiana, Iowa, Minnesota, Missouri (also considered extirpated), New York, Ohio, Pennsylvania, and Wisconsin. Michigan, the only state in which it is not considered endangered, lists it as "special concern". The subspecies is a candidate for federal listing. As of 2016, the massasauga is listed as Threatened under the Endangered Species Act.

The massasauga is listed as threatened under both Ontario's Endangered Species Act, 2007, and the federal Species at Risk Act, and is protected under the Fish and Wildlife Conservation Act. It is found only near the eastern shore of Georgian Bay, the Bruce Peninsula, the North Shore of Lake Huron, Wainfleet Bog, and Ojibway Prairie. It is becoming rare in Canada due to persecution and loss of habitat and is designated as "threatened" by the Committee on the Status of Endangered Wildlife in Canada (COSEWIC), as well as the Committee on the Status of Species-at-risk in Ontario (COSSARO).

In Pennsylvania, the species has experienced a rapid decline largely because of habitat loss. Historically, this has been due to human activity and more recently primarily from natural forest succession. By 1988, the snake had disappeared from half of the counties that constituted its historical range. A 2003–2005 survey showed only four locations in two counties with confirmed populations. It is classified as "critically imperiled" to "imperiled" in the commonwealth.

Diet
The diet of S. catenatus consists of a variety of small vertebrates, including mammals, birds, bird eggs, lizards, and other snakes, as well as invertebrates such as centipedes and insects. Mammals and reptiles make up the bulk of their diet. Adults feed mainly on rodents (such as voles, white-footed mice, jumping mice, and shrews), while juveniles usually prey on reptiles, more often lizards in western populations and snakes in eastern ones. Frogs also constitute an important part of their diet: Ruthven (1928) mentioned that in Michigan they made up the main portion of their diet. According to Klauber (1956), S. catenatus feeds on frogs more frequently than any other rattlesnake. In general, however, frogs are not an important part of the diet, although this does seem to be more typical in certain northern and eastern populations.

Venom
The venom of S. c. catenatus is a cytotoxic venom, so it destroys tissue. It also contains specialized digestive enzymes that disrupt blood flow and prevent blood clotting. Severe internal bleeding causes the death of the small animals that this snake eats. After envenomation, the rattlesnake is able to withdraw from the dangers of sharp-toothed prey animals until they are subdued and even partially digested by the action of the venom.

S. c. catenatus is rather shy and avoids humans when it can. Most massasauga snakebites in Ontario have occurred after people deliberately handled or accidentally stepped on one of these animals. Both of these scenarios can be prevented by avoiding hiking through areas of low visibility (in rattlesnake country) when not wearing shoes and long pants and by leaving the snakes alone if encountered. Only two incidents of people dying from massasauga rattlesnake bites in Ontario have been recorded; in both cases, the victims did not receive proper treatment.

Subspecies

References

Further reading

 Ontario Snakes, Ontario Ministry of Natural Resources, Toronto, 1981. P. 36.
  (Crotalinus catenatus, new species, p. 41).

External links

Massasauga at Encyclopædia Britannica. Accessed 22 June 2005.
Eastern Massasauga at Learn Animals. Accessed 30 January 2007.
Massasauga Rattlesnake on Reptiles and Amphibians of Iowa

Sistrurus
Reptiles of Canada
Reptiles of the United States
Reptiles of Ontario
Reptiles described in 1818
ESA threatened species
Taxa named by Constantine Samuel Rafinesque